Bilsk may refer to the following places in Ukraine:

 Bilsk, Kotelva Raion, a village in Kotelva Raion, Poltava Oblast
 Bilsk, Rokytne Raion, a village in Rivne Oblast, Ukraine